Puthuvayil Narayana Panicker (1 March 1909 – 19 June 1995) is known as the Father of the Library Movement in the Indian state of Kerala. The activities of the Kerala Grandhasala Sangham that he initiated triggered a popular cultural movement in Kerala which produced universal literacy in the state in the 1990s.

June 19, his death anniversary, has been observed in Kerala as Vayanadinam (Reading Day) since 1996. The Department of Education in Kerala also observes Vayana varam (Reading Week) for a week from June 19 to 25.

In 2017, Indian Prime Minister Narendra Modi declared June 19, Kerala's Reading Day, as National Reading Day in India. The following month is also observed as National Reading Month in India.

Early life of PN Panicker

Panicker was born in a Nair family on 1909 March 1 to Govinda Pillai and Janaky Amma at Neelamperoor, India. In 1926 he started the Sanadanadharmam Library as a teacher in his hometown. he was a teacher and his influence on society was much greater than many of his time.

Contributions
Panicker led the formation of Thiruvithaamkoor Granthasala Sangham (Travancore Library Association) in 1945 with 47 rural libraries. The slogan of the organization was 'Read and Grow'''. Later on, with the formation of Kerala State in 1956, it became Kerala Granthasala Sangham (KGS). He traveled to the villages of Kerala proclaiming the value of reading. He succeeded in bringing some 6,000 libraries into this network. Grandhasala Sangham won the ‘Krupsakaya Award’ from UNESCO in 1975. Panicker was the General Secretary of Sangham for 32 years, until 1977, when it was taken over by the State Government. It became the Kerala State Library Council, with an in-built democratic structure and funding.

KANFED

After his organization was taken over by the State, Panicker became subject to political interference. In 1977 he responded by founding the Kerala Association for Non-formal Education and Development (KANFED). KANFED was instrumental in starting the Kerala State Literacy Mission, which led Kerala to its universal literacy movement. Thus, Kerala became the first state which achieved universal literacy.

Panicker took a keen interest in promoting Agricultural Books Corners, The Friendship Village Movement (Sauhrudagramam), Reading Programmes for Families, Grants for Books and building libraries and Best Reader's Award P.N. Panicker Foundation.

Legacy 

Panicker died on 19 June 1995, at age 86. The Government of Kerala acknowledged his contributions and ordered that 19 June be observed, annually, as Vaayanadinam'' (READING DAY ) with a week-long series of activities at schools and public institutions to honor his contributions to the cause of literacy, education and library movement.

The Department of Posts honored Panicker by issuing a commemorative postage stamp on 21 June 2004.

His birth centenary was celebrated under the auspices of the P. N. Panicker Foundation in 2010.

References

External links
 Official Portal of Government of Kerala
 KANFED and the Adult Education Scene in Kerala
 Chapter 4: Non-formal education from Literacy in Kerala: Report of research undertaken November 2005 – October 2006
 UNESCO International Fellowships/Awards/Prizes–Winners from India
 P.N.PANICKER stamp released

1995 deaths
Indian librarians
People from Kerala
1909 births